LAN-Chile Flight 107 was a regular scheduled international flight from the Chilean capital Santiago to Buenos Aires in Argentina. On 6 February 1965, the Douglas DC-6B-404 operating the flight crashed in the Andes. All 87 occupants of the aircraft died in the crash.

Accident
The DC-6 departed from Santiago-Los Cerrillos Airport on the morning of 6 February with 80 passengers and seven crew members on board, on a flight to Ministro Pistarini International Airport in Ezeiza, near Buenos Aires. When the aircraft was at flight level 120, in the Las Melosas area of the Andes, it crashed into the side of La Corona Mountain, approximately 1,200 feet below its summit. There were no survivors.

Twenty-two of the passengers had been players and staff of Santiago's Antonio Varas football team, who were on their way to Uruguay for a match against the Camadeo team in Montevideo.

As of 2021, Flight 107 was the deadliest aviation disaster in Chilean history and the second-deadliest aviation accident involving a DC-6, behind Olympic Airways Flight 954.

Cause
The accident investigation board attributed the accident to the pilot in command of the aircraft, who chose to follow a route that was neither in accordance with the approved flight plan nor the airline's operations manual. Weather was not a factor in the crash.

See also
List of accidents involving sports teams

References

External links
 

Aviation accidents and incidents in 1965
Accidents and incidents involving the Douglas DC-6
Aviation accidents and incidents in Chile
Airliner accidents and incidents caused by pilot error
Airliner accidents and incidents involving controlled flight into terrain
1965 in Chile
107
February 1965 events in South America
1965 disasters in Chile